SCOPE (Supervisory Control of Program Execution) is a series of Control Data Corporation operating systems developed in the 1960s.

Variants
 SCOPE for the CDC 3000 series
 SCOPE for the CDC 6000 series
 SCOPE and SCOPE-2 for the CDC 7600/Cyber-76

SCOPE for the CDC 3000 series

SCOPE for the CDC 6000 series

This operating system was based on the original Chippewa Operating System. In the early 1970s, it was renamed NOS/BE for the CDC Cyber machines. The SCOPE operating system is a file-oriented system using mass storage, random access devices. It was designed to make use of all capabilities of CDC 6000 computer systems and exploits fully the multiple-operating modes of all segments of the computer. Main tasks of SCOPE are controlling job execution, storage assignment, performing segment and overlay loading. Its features include comprehensive input/output functions and library maintenance routines. The dayfile chronologically records all jobs run and any problems encountered. To aid debugging, dumps and memory maps are available. Under control of SCOPE, a variety of assemblers (COMPASS), compilers (ALGOL, FORTRAN, COBOL), and utility programs (SORT/MERGE, PERT/TIME, EXPORT/IMPORT, RESPOND, SIMSCRIPT, APT, OPTIMA etc.) may be operated. The computer emulation community has made repeated attempts to recover and preserve this software. It is now running under a CDC CYBER and 6000 series emulator.

Competition
SCOPE was written by a programming team in Sunnyvale, California, about 2,000 miles from the CDC hardware division.  It was considered by them a buggy and inefficient piece of software, though not much different than many operating systems of the era.  At the CDC Arden Hills, Minnesota laboratories (where they referred to SCOPE as Sunnyvale's Collection Of Programming Errors) they had a competing operating system, MACE.  This was the Mansfield And Cahlander Executive (from Greg Mansfield and Dave Cahlander, the authors of the system).  It had started as an engineering test executive, but eventually developed into a complete operating system — a modularized rewrite and enhancement of the original Chippewa Operating System (COS).  While never an official CDC product, a copy was freely given to any customer who asked for one.  Many customers did, especially the more advanced ones (like University and research sites).

When Control Data decided to write its next operating system Kronos, it considered both the current SCOPE system and the unofficial MACE alternative.  They chose to abandon the SCOPE system and base Kronos on the MACE software.  Eventually, Kronos was replaced by the new Network Operating System (NOS).  Though many smaller CDC customers continued to use the SCOPE system rather than Kronos.  When NOS became the primary Control Data operating system, some customers running mainly batch operations were reluctant to switch to the NOS system, as they saw no benefit for their shop.  So the SCOPE system was maintained, and renamed as NOS/BE (Batch Environment), primarily so that CDC Marketing could say that all mainframe customers were using the NOS operating system.

See also
 CDC Kronos
 NOS

SCOPE
Discontinued operating systems
1964 software